Dr. Seth Gopin is the Director of Global Programs at Rutgers University. He has also been a professor of Art History there. He has received the French award of Chevalier in the Order of the Academic Palm.

References

Year of birth missing (living people)
Living people
American art historians
Rutgers University alumni
Rutgers University faculty